Doggy Style Records (formerly known as Dogghouse Records) is an American record label founded by rapper Snoop Dogg in 1995. It is named after Snoop Dogg's debut album, Doggystyle (1993).

History

On July 6, 1995, Doggy Style Records, Inc. was registered with the California Secretary of State as business entity number C1923139. After Snoop Dogg was acquitted of murder charges on February 20, 1996, he and the mother of his son and their kennel of 20 pit bulls moved into a  home in the hills of Claremont, California and by August 1996, Doggy Style Records, a subsidiary of Death Row Records, signed The Gap Band's Charlie Wilson as one of the record label's first artists.

Discography

References

American record labels
Gangsta rap record labels
Hip hop record labels
Record labels based in California
Companies based in Los Angeles County, California
Record labels established in 1995